Mitchell Fraboni is an American football long snapper for the Denver Broncos of the National Football League (NFL). He played college football at Arizona State University  and went undrafted in the 2018 NFL Draft. He was signed and released from the Houston Texans of the NFL in the 2021 offseason.

Early life and education

High school
Fraboni attended Mountain Pointe High School where he played football. He played multiple positions including tight end, defensive end, and long snapper. He helped Mountain Pointe win their first ever Arizona State Football championship. He finished with 49 solo tackles, 10 sacks and 68 total tackles during high school.

College career
Mitchell was a long snapper and defensive end for the Sun Devils from 2014 to 2017. He had 13 total tackles and one fumble recovery in 4 seasons as a defensive end. He tied for the most special team tackles on the Sun Devils in his sophomore season at ASU. He was injured in his junior season, but came back and showed he was one of the most accurate/athletic long snappers in the PAC-12. In his senior season he was named to Phil Steele's all Pac-12 team and was one of ten Sun Devils to earn All Pac-12 Academic Honors.

He and kicker Zane Gonzalez and punter Matt Haack (both current NFL players) formed one of the best kicking units in the country. He was praised for being a good locker room presence by special teams coach Shawn Slocum. As a senior, he was a key component in helping the Sun Devils special teams flourish after Gonzales and Haack left for the NFL. Slocum also said that he was half player, half coach for the younger players.

College statistics

Professional career

The Spring League
He was a part of The Spring League's Alphas and Conquerors for one season in 2020.

Houston Texans (NFL)
Fraboni was signed and cut by the Houston Texans in the 2021 offseason and worked out for the Bears. He was invited to the Texans mini camp in 2018 and the Arizona Cardinals mini camp in 2019.

United States Football League
Mitchell Fraboni was selected in the 35th round of the 2022 USFL Draft by the Pittsburgh Maulers.

Denver Broncos (NFL)
On October 11, 2022, Fraboni was signed to the Denver Broncos practice squad. Fraboni was promoted to the active roster on October 24.

References

1998 births
Living people
Date of birth missing (living people)
American football long snappers
Pittsburgh Maulers (2022) players
Arizona State Sun Devils football players
Players of American football from Phoenix, Arizona
The Spring League players
Denver Broncos players